Battle of Savannah  may refer to:

The 1778 British Capture of Savannah during the American Revolutionary War
The 1779 American Siege of Savannah during the American Revolution 
Closing Savannah as a port following the Siege of Fort Pulaski in 1862
The capture of Savannah following Sherman's March to the Sea in 1864